Consolida ajacis (doubtful knight's spur or rocket larkspur) is an annual flowering plant of the family Ranunculaceae native to Eurasia. It is widespread in other areas, including much of North America, where it is an introduced species. It is frequently grown in gardens as an ornamental for its spikes of blue, pink or white flowers. It may reach a meter in height. Since the aerial parts and seeds of C. ajacis have been found to contain diterpenoid alkaloids (see below), including the highly toxic methyllycaconitine, the plants should be considered as poisonous.

Sowing
In the UK, Consolida ajacis can be sowed under cover between February and April, or directly outdoors between April and May and/or late August and September.

Flowering
In Europe, it flowers between June and October.

Chemical constituents
The first alkaloid to be isolated from C. ajacis seeds was ajaconine, reported by Keller and Volker in 1914. Since that time, over thirty other structurally related diterpenoid alkaloids have been reported; these are:

14-acetylbrowniine

14-acetyldelcosine

14-acetyldelectine

13-O-acetylvakhmatine

ajabicine

ajacine

ajacusine

ajadelphine

ajadelphinine

ajadine

ajadinine

ajanine

ambiguine

anthranoyllycoctonine

browniine

14-deacetylajadine

14-deacetylambiguine

delajacine

delajacirine

delajadine

delcosine

delectine

delphatine

delpheline

delphisine

delsoline

deltaline

deltatsine

dihydroajaconine

gigactonine

lycoctonine

18-methoxygadesine

methyllycaconitine

19-oxoanthranoyllycoctonine

19-oxodelphatine

takaosamine

vakhmatine

Gallery

References

External links
Jepson Manual Treatment

ajacis
Plants described in 1753
Taxa named by Carl Linnaeus